Avtar Singh Rikhy (born 23 December 1923) was an Indian civil servant who was the former Secretary-General of the 6th Lok Sabha and 7th Lok Sabha (Lower House of Parliament of India). He succeeded Shri S. L. Shakdhar after his appointment as the Chief Election Commissioner.

Early life
Sardar Rikhy had his higher education from Punjab University and Calcutta University. He was Double M.A. in History and English. He stood third in order of merit in the Punjab University in M.A. (English) 1945; diploma in Journalism, Punjab University 1944; diploma in Social Work (Welfare), Calcutta University, 1948 where he stood second in order of merit; after being successful in the All-India Combined Services Competitive Examination, 1945 served in various administrative capacities in the government, 1946–1956.

Positions held

 Deputy Secretary, Lok Sabha, 1956–69
 Joint Secretary, Lok Sabha, 1969–74
 Additional Secretary, 1974–77
 Secretary, Lok Sabha, 1977–83
 Secretary-General, Lok Sabha, 22-31 Dec 1983

References

External links
http://legislativebodiesinindia.nic.in/chairman%20SECY.htm
https://web.archive.org/web/20110703133158/http://164.100.47.132/LssNew/Members/lokprelist.aspx?lsno=7
https://web.archive.org/web/20110703133208/http://164.100.47.132/LssNew/Members/lokprelist.aspx?lsno=6
http://parliamentofindia.nic.in/ls/lok06/lok06.htm
http://parliamentofindia.nic.in/ls/lok07/lok07.htm
https://web.archive.org/web/20110718101556/http://www.sikhreview.org/pdf/july2003/pdf-files/member.pdf
http://pib.nic.in/archieve/pelection2007.pdf
Source Sixth Lok Sabha

1923 births
Living people
Indian civil servants
University of Calcutta alumni
Panjab University alumni
Secretaries General of the Lok Sabha